Orthofidonia tinctaria, the marbled wave, is a species of geometrid moth in the family Geometridae. It is found in North America.

The MONA or Hodges number for Orthofidonia tinctaria is 6428.

References

Further reading

 

Boarmiini
Articles created by Qbugbot
Moths described in 1860